Chuini is a village on the Tanzanian island of Unguja, part of Zanzibar. It is located in the west of the island, 12 kilometres north of the capital, Zanzibar City.

References

Finke, J. (2006) The Rough Guide to Zanzibar (2nd edition). New York: Rough Guides.

Villages in Zanzibar